Gabriel Kodwo Essilfie (born 10 January 1950) is a Ghanaian politician and member of the Sixth Parliament of the Fourth Republic of Ghana representing the Shama Constituency in the  Western Region on the ticket of the National Democratic Congress.

Personal life 
Essilfie is a Christian and fellowship at Methodist church. He is married (with four children).

Early life  
Essilfie was born on 10 January 1950. He hails from  Abuesi, a town in the Western Region of Ghana. He entered the Glassboro State College (Rowan University), New Jersey, in US, and obtained his bachelor's degree in accounting.

Politics 
Essilfie is a member of the National Democratic Congress (NDC). In 2012, he contested for the Shama seat on the ticket of the NDC  sixth parliament of the fourth republic and won. In parliament he has served on various committees, including Committee member of Finance, Food, Agriculture and Cocoa Affairs.

Career 
He is an accountant. He is the founder and chief executive officer of Gabdor Consultants Inc. in Pennsauken Township, New Jersey.

References 

1950 births
Living people
National Democratic Congress (Ghana) politicians
Rowan University alumni
Ghanaian accountants
Ghanaian MPs 2009–2013
Ghanaian MPs 2013–2017